The Ministry of Foreign Affairs is the ministry responsible for handling Qatar's external relations as well as its diplomatic efforts, including the maintenance of its diplomatic missions across the globe. As a perk related to its position, the Minister of Foreign Affairs gets to set the central agenda for the nation's propaganda outlet Al-Jazeera. The current minister is Mohammed bin Abdulrahman Al Thani.

History
Qatar was a part of the Ottoman Empire until the end of World War I, at which point it became a protectorate under British rule. After achieving full independence from the United Kingdom in 1971, the Qatari government established an independent foreign ministry.

List of ministers
Source: 
1971–1972: Sheikh Khalifa bin Hamad Al Thani
1972–1985: Sheikh Suhaim bin Hamad Al Thani
1985–1989: Sheikh Ahmed bin Saif Al Thani
1989–1990: Abdullah bin Khalifa al-Attiyah
1990–1992: Mubarak Ali al-Khater
1992–2013: Sheikh Hamad bin Jassim bin Jaber Al Thani
2013–2016: Khalid bin Mohammad Al Attiyah
2016–present: Sheikh Mohammed bin Abdulrahman Al Thani

See also
 Politics of Qatar

References

Government ministries of Qatar
Qatar
Foreign relations of Qatar
Qatar, Foreign Affairs
1971 establishments in Qatar